Helianthella quinquenervis, the fivenerve helianthella, is a North American plant species in the family Asteraceae. It grows in the mountains of the western United States and northern Mexico. This include the Rockies, the Black Hills, the ranges of the Great Basin, and the northern Sierra Madre, from Montana, Oregon, and South Dakota south as far as western Chihuahua and Coahuila.

The plant usually produces only one yellow flower head per stem, nodding (hanging). Each head contains 8-21 bright yellow ray flowers surrounding numerous yellow disc flowers.

References

External links

quinquenervis
Flora of the Western United States
Flora of Northwestern Mexico
Plants described in 1847
Flora without expected TNC conservation status